Drauffelt railway station is a railway station serving the village of Drauffelt, in the commune of Munshausen, in northern Luxembourg.  It is operated by Chemins de Fer Luxembourgeois, the state-owned railway company.

The station is situated on Line 10, which connects Luxembourg City to the centre and north of the country.

External links
 Official CFL page on Drauffelt station
 Rail.lu page on Drauffelt station

Munshausen
Railway stations in Luxembourg
Railway stations on CFL Line 10